Cape Tribulation is a headland and coastal locality in the Shire of Douglas in northern Queensland, Australia.

Geography 
It is within the Daintree National Park and the Wet Tropics World Heritage area. It is within the local government area of Shire of Douglas (between 2008 and 2013, it was within the Cairns Region). 

The locality contains a small number of bed and breakfast eco lodges, tourism resorts and backpacker hostels. A few very rare plants can be found on Cape Tribulation.

History
Kuku Yalanji  (also known as Gugu Yalanji, Kuku Yalaja, and Kuku Yelandji) is an Australian Aboriginal language of the Mossman and Daintree areas of  North Queensland. The language region includes areas within the local government area of Shire of Douglas and Shire of Cook, particularly the localities of Mossman, Daintree, Bloomfield River, China Camp, Maytown, Palmer, Cape Tribulation and Wujal Wujal.

Yalanji  (also known as Kuku Yalanji, Kuku Yalaja, Kuku Yelandji, and Gugu Yalanji) is an Australian Aboriginal language of Far North Queensland. The traditional language region is Mossman River in the south to the Annan River in the north, bordered by the Pacific Ocean in the east and extending inland to west of Mount Mulgrave. This includes the local government boundaries of the Shire of Douglas, the Shire of Cook and the Aboriginal Shire of Wujal Wujal and the towns and localities of Cooktown,  Mossman, Daintree, Cape Tribulation and Wujal Wujal. It includes the head of the Palmer River, the Bloomfield River, China Camp, Maytown, and Palmerville.

Cape Tribulation was named by British navigator Lieutenant James Cook on 10 June 1770 (log date) after his ship scraped a reef north east of the cape, whilst passing over it, at 6pm. Cook steered away from the coast into deeper water but at 10.30pm the ship ran aground, on what is now named Endeavour Reef. The ship stuck fast and was badly damaged, desperate measures being needed to prevent it foundering until it was refloated the next day. Cook recorded "...the north point [was named] Cape Tribulation because "here begun all our troubles".

In the 1930s some European settlers started arriving in Cape Tribulation, but they found the rainforest environment an extremely challenging one within which to establish a settlement. Various ventures such as fruit and vegetable farming, fishing, cattle, and timber cutting were started and abandoned over the years, and having weekly barges as the only transport in and out was another limitation. In the 1960s a rough track was bulldozed and the first vehicle access created, although the road remained a four-wheel drive track until the early 1990s. In 2002, the road was finally sealed all the way to Cape Tribulation and in early 2011 the last bridge was built creating year round all weather access to Cape Tribulation for the first time.

Protests
In 1983, Cape Tribulation became widely known because of the blockade on the Bloomfield Track. Local government had decided to bulldoze a road through the rainforest north of Cape Tribulation to complete the coastal road to Cooktown.  Protesters tried to stop the bulldozers and occupied trees to prevent their destruction. While wild scenes with a large police and media presence ensued at the southern end, the road was completed in three short weeks as the road builders approached from northern end and flanked the protestors. By now the state and federal governments had started to realise the value of this ancient rainforest and despite protests from the local council the forests surrounding Cape Tribulation were given World Heritage Listing in 1988.

Climate

The average annual rainfall for Cape Tribulation is 3,900 mm.

See also

 Tourism in Australia
Cape Tribulation (Mars)

References

External links

Movies of Cape Tribulation and cassowaries

Populated places in Far North Queensland
Tribulation
Localities in Queensland
Shire of Douglas
Landforms of Far North Queensland
Coastline of Queensland